Alton McClain and Destiny was an American disco girl group from Los Angeles, California. Formed in 1978, the trio was composed of McClain, Delores Marie "D'Marie" Warren, and Robyrda Stiger. They signed to Polydor Records in the year of their formation and Frank Wilson produced their debut set. It was released as a self-titled album early in 1979 but then was repackaged under the title It Must Be Love several months later. The title track was released as a single and charted, but the second album did not sell well. The group was dropped less than a year after its release and they split in 1981.

McClain later married producer Skip Scarborough and continued working in the music industry. Alton McClain continued recording as a gospel singer, releasing albums God's Woman in 1995 and Renaissance in 2005. Robyrda Stiger and D'Marie Warren signed with Epic Records as a part of the girl group Krystol. The group also included singer-songwriters Tina Scott, and Karon Floyd- who would later be replaced by Robbie Danzie, due to Floyd going on maternity leave by the release of their second album Talk of the Town.
 
Krystol's first two albums were produced by former SOLAR Records in-house producer Leon Sylvers III. D. Marie Warren member who was born May 30, 1951 died in a car crash on February 22, 1985 at age 33, before Talk of the Town was released.

In 2012, the first two albums by Krystol- Gettin' Ready and Talk of the Town were reissued by Sony Music Entertainment reissue label Funkytown Grooves. The third album, Passion from a Woman was reissued in June 2013.

Discography

Albums
As Alton McClain and Destiny

As Krystol

Singles
As Alton McClain and Destiny

As Krystol

References

External links
 

Musical groups from Los Angeles
American disco groups
American girl groups